Charlanta is one of the Megaregions of the United States, and is part of the Piedmont Atlantic Megaregion. Extending along the I-85 Corridor, the region stretches from Charlotte to Atlanta.  With more than $1 trillion in economic output, it is considered one of the 12 regional powerhouses that drive the economy of the United States. Based on projections, this region's urban areas will "expand 165%, from 17,800 km2 in 2009 to 47,500 km2 in 2060," ultimately connecting the urban sprawl of Atlanta and Charlotte. Researchers have expressed concern that this urban development will create a warmer climate along the corridor and increase flood risks in the region.

References

Geography of Atlanta
Geography of Charlotte, North Carolina
Geography of Greenville, South Carolina
Megapolitan areas of the United States